Marie-Geneviève Bouliard (born Paris, 1763; died Saône-et-Loire, 1825) was a French artist who primarily painted portraits.

She was a pupil of Jean-Baptiste Greuze, Joseph-Benoît Suvée, Joseph Duplessis.
Her Aspasia, a self-portrait, was produced in 1794. It was exhibited in the 1795 Paris Salon where it received a Prix d'Encouragement.

Her painting Portrait of an Actress, Probably Mlle. Bélier, was included in the 1905 book Women Painters of the World.

References

1763 births
1825 deaths
French women painters
18th-century French painters
19th-century French painters
French portrait painters
Painters from Paris
19th-century French women artists
18th-century French women artists